The Garrison Savannah in the country of Barbados, is a horse racing venue located within the Garrison Historic Area, just outside the capital-city Bridgetown. A clockwise grass course, the Garrison Savannah is known internationally for the annual Barbados Gold Cup for Thoroughbreds which takes place on the six-furlong track around the perimeter of the green.

The racetrack also is host to the annual Barbados Triple Crown of Thoroughbred Racing series. 

Racing has taken place at the location since the days that a British garrison was stationed there. 

In 2012 a network of subterranean tunnels were found to exist below the area.

Gallery

See also 
 Sport in Barbados

References

External links 

Barbados Turf Club - Official website for horse racing at the Savannah.
Aerial photo of the Garrison Savannah Racetrack #1
Aerial photo of the Garrison Savannah Racetrack #2

Sports venues in Barbados
Saint Michael, Barbados
Horse racing venues in Barbados
Horse racing in Barbados
Military of Barbados
Cricket grounds in Barbados
Defunct cricket grounds in Barbados